Nine ships of the Royal Navy have been named HMS Severn after the River Severn:

 The first  was a 50-gun fourth rate launched in 1695, rebuilt in 1739, captured by the French in 1746, and recaptured by the Royal Navy in 1747 but not taken back into service.
 The second  was a 50-gun fourth rate launched in 1747 and sold in 1759.
 The next HMS Severn was to have been a 38-gun fifth rate. She was renamed  before her launch.
 The third  was a 44-gun  fifth rate launched in 1786 and wrecked in 1804.
 The fourth  was a 40-gun  fourth rate launched in 1813 and sold in 1825.
 The next HMS Severn was to have been a 46-gun fifth rate. She was ordered in 1825 but cancelled in 1831.
 The fifth  was a 50-gun fourth rate launched in 1856, one of the last sail frigates. She was converted to screw propulsion in 1860 and was broken up in 1876.
 The sixth  was a  protected cruiser launched in 1885 and sold in 1905.
 The seventh  was a  monitor, launched for Brazil in 1913 but purchased in 1914 and sold in 1921, being scrapped in 1923.
 The eighth  was a  launched in 1934 and scrapped in 1946.
 The ninth and latest  is a  launched in 2002.

Battle honours 
 Algiers 1816 
 Belgian Coast 1914
 Konigsberg 1915 
 Sicily 1943
 Aegean 1943 
 Norway 1940 
 Atlantic 1940–1941

References
 

Royal Navy ship names